Dún Laoghaire–Rathdown County Council is the authority responsible for local government in the county of Dún Laoghaire–Rathdown, Ireland. It is one of three local authorities that succeeded the former Dublin County Council on its abolition on 1 January 1994 and one of four councils in the old County Dublin. As a county council, it is governed by the Local Government Act 2001. The council is responsible for housing and community, roads and transportation, urban planning and development, amenity and culture, and environment. The council has 40 elected members. Elections are held every five years and are by single transferable vote. The head of the council has the title of Cathaoirleach (Chairperson). The county administration is headed by a Chief Executive, Frank Curran. The county town is Dún Laoghaire. It serves a population of approximately 206,260.

History
Dún Laoghaire–Rathdown County Council came into being on 1 January 1994.

Dún Laoghaire–Rathdown County Council is a successor to local government structures that have existed in the area since 1834. The Council was established under the Local Government (Dublin) Act 1993 by the merger of the Corporation of Dún Laoghaire and that part of Dublin County Council that chiefly corresponded to the former Rathdown No 1 Rural District.

The two sides of the county have distinct histories in terms of local government structures. On the Dún Laoghaire side of the county, the Borough of Dún Laoghaire had been established by the Local Government (Dublin) Act 1930 as a successor body to urban districts of Dún Laoghaire, Blackrock, Dalkey, and Killiney and Ballybrack. Those Commissioners for Kingstown were established in 1834 and were subsequently renamed Kingstown Urban District Council and then Dún Laoghaire Urban District Council. On the Rathdown side of the County, Dublin County Council and Rathdown No. 1 Rural District Council were established under the Local Government (Ireland) Act 1898. Rathdown No. 1 Rural District Council was abolished by the Local Government (Dublin) Act 1930.

On its formation, the Town Hall in Dún Laoghaire became the headquarters of Dún Laoghaire–Rathdown County Council. It was subsequently renamed County Hall.

Local electoral areas
Dún Laoghaire–Rathdown County Council has 40 seats, which is divided into the following seven local electoral areas, defined by electoral divisions.

Councillors

2019 seats summary

Councillors by electoral area
This list reflects the order in which councillors were elected on 24 May 2019.

Notes

Co-options

Changes in affiliation

Controversies

M50 and compensation to Jackson Way Properties
An agreement was reached for Dún Laoghaire–Rathdown County Council to compensate Jackson Way Properties by €12,860,700 for the compulsory purchase in October 1998 of its freehold interest in the lands, adjoining the M50 motorway. The Council agreed to pay costs and expenses properly incurred by Jackson Way Properties in relation to preparation and submission of its claim.

The 2003 award total is broken down as follows:
 Land taken – €9,691,000
 Injurious affection – €2,296,700 and
 Disturbance – €873,000.

It had been the view of the Criminal Assets Bureau (CAB) that €4.2 million of this award represents the present value of corrupt enrichment by the property owners although this view is based on hearsay evidence given by Frank Dunlop. A company called Paisley Park Investments Ltd were registered as full owners in 1992 and the land was transferred to Jackson Way Properties in 1993, the beneficial owners of which are believed by CAB to be arcade owner James Kennedy and solicitor John Coldwell. However, in January 2014 the freezing order was lifted owing to the collapse of the associated political corruption trial involving Dún Laoghaire Rathdown County Council Cathaoirleach Tony Fox; damages were subsequently sought against CAB by Jackson Way.

In early 2016, the Office of the Information Commissioner found against the council for refusing to comply with a Freedom of Information request relating to the case, stating as follows, "I find it very difficult to accept that the Council holds no records coming within the scope of the request that cannot be released to the applicant under the FOI Act. It seems to me that the Council adopted a blanket approach to the request by claiming that the exemptions applied to all records coming within the scope of the request and did not conduct a record by record examination."

Criminal Assets Bureau investigation
CAB contended that these lands had been rezoned on 16 December 1997 by Dún Laoghaire–Rathdown County Council from agricultural to industrial use after Frank Dunlop bribed and made corrupt payments to councillors to secure their support in the rezoning vote. That vote increased the value of just  of the property from €8 million to €61 million. CAB has interviewed and taken statements from Dunlop and will use him as a witness against a number of property developers; Dunlop served a jail sentence for corruption in Arbour Hill from May 2009 to July 2010.

The lands in question have been the subject of investigation by the Mahon Tribunal in 2003 and 2004.

Criminal Assets Bureau v. Jackson Way Properties was due for hearing in the High Court Dublin in October 2010, which was vigorously defended with Jackson Way denying any wrongdoing and Mr Kennedy a tax exile currently living in Gibraltar returning to give evidence in the case. Jackson Way gave the court notice that they intend to subpoena councillors to give evidence. No Dún Laoghaire-Rathdown representative to date has been charged with any form of wrongdoing in relation to rezoning, likely because in January 2014 the freezing order was lifted owing to the collapse of a political corruption trial involving Frank Dunlop and Jacksonway's subsequent legal proceedings against CAB.

Revenue generation 
There have been complaints about the Council's policies regarding commercial rates and parking charges and also complaints from business owners in the town about the way in which the Council enforces the collection of parking charges and fines. Dún Laoghaire-Rathdown local authority area has the second highest level of revenue generation of local authorities in the state after Dublin City.

References

External links

Local government in County Dublin
County councils in the Republic of Ireland
Politics of Dún Laoghaire–Rathdown